Bruno Clausen (7 March 1912 – 7 January 1957) was a Danish sailor. He competed in the 6 Metre event at the 1948 Summer Olympics.

References

External links
 

1912 births
1957 deaths
Danish male sailors (sport)
Olympic sailors of Denmark
Sailors at the 1948 Summer Olympics – 6 Metre
Sportspeople from Aarhus